Khee Liang Phoa (Chinese: 潘科良; born May 1955, Rotterdam) is a Dutch former politician, who served as undersecretary for emancipation and family affairs in the first Balkenende cabinet from September 2002 to May 2003.

Phoa was born in Rotterdam to Chinese Indonesian parents who had moved to the Netherlands from the Dutch East Indies. He worked in physiotherapy and ran his own practice prior to working for Foundation for the Responsible Use of Alcohol as a managing director. He was elected to the Dutch Member of the House of Representatives during the 2002 general election as a member of the Pim Fortuyn List (LPF), making him the first Dutch MP of Chinese descent to be elected to the House.

He succeeded Philomena Bijlhout (who had to resign a few hours after her designation following revelations about her past as a militia member in Suriname), on behalf of the LPF as minister for family affairs. He was not included in the second Balkenende cabinet in May 2003, and received a public allowance for two-and-a-half years that related to less than nine months' time as a government minister. He used this money to explore his Chinese roots and study Chinese at the Beijing University of Posts and Telecommunications from 2004 to 2005. He has lived and worked in Beijing since then, after obtaining a position with the freight company Vincent International. From 2006 to 2017 Phoa was also a lecturer in business at the Capital University of Economics and Business in China.

See also
 European politicians of Chinese descent

Sources

1955 births
Living people
Politicians from Rotterdam
Pim Fortuyn List politicians
21st-century Dutch politicians
Dutch politicians of Chinese descent
Dutch people of Chinese descent
Dutch people of Indonesian descent
Dutch expatriates in China
State Secretaries for Social Affairs of the Netherlands